Jessica Joy Seria Reynoso (born November 12, 1997), known professionally as J. Rey Soul, is a Filipino-American musician known for participating in the first season of The Voice of the Philippines and collaborating and touring with the Black Eyed Peas since 2018.

Starting her musical career at an early age, she appeared on the first season of The Voice of the Philippines and joined coach apl.de.ap's team, becoming a finalist in the show. After a couple of released singles and a collaboration with apl.de.ap, Reynoso joined the Black Eyed Peas as a semi-official member, replacing Fergie as their singer in 2018.

Early life and career  
Reynoso was born on November 12, 1997 in San Pedro, Laguna to an African-American father and a Filipina mother. She grew up in the Philippines with her adoptive parents, never meeting her biological father, and was exposed to music at a young age. According to Reynoso, she was able to sing the Whitney Houston song "The Greatest Love of All" in front of her family at age 5. In 2007, she joined the competition show Popstar Kids at age 9. In a later interview, she says that she didn't get much attention due to her skin color. She completed her contract with the GMA Network, the network who produced the show, in 2012. She attended PATTS College of Aeronautics taking Air Freight Operations, which she graduated from in 2015.

Musical career 
On July 21, 2013, Reynoso auditioned for the first season of The Voice of the Philippines, singing the Alicia Keys song "Fallin'". Coaches Lea Salonga and apl.de.ap tried to get her on their respective teams, with Reynoso choosing Team Apl for the competition. In the fourth live-show episode of the show, Reynoso was put against Janice Javier, with Reynoso losing to Javier when the scores of the coaches and the audience was added up. In 2014, Reynoso was signed to apl.de.ap's label, BMBX.

In 2018, Reynoso (now going under her stage name J. Rey Soul) collaborated with apl.de.ap's group Black Eyed Peas on their album Masters of the Sun Vol. 1, after previous singer Fergie departed from the group. She had been inducted into the group as a "semi-official" member who would collaborate and tour with them. In 2020, she collaborated with them again alongside rapper Ozuna with the song "Mamacita". She was then involved with their albums Translation (2020) and Elevation (2022).

In 2021, she signed with Epic Records and released the single "Pull Up" with will.i.am featuring Nile Rodgers, which was used for the Mercedes-Benz AMG campaign. That same year, she sang the national anthem of the Philippines at the professional boxing match between Manny Pacquiao and Yordenis Ugás.

Discography

As lead artist

Collaborations

References 

1997 births
Black Eyed Peas members
Living people
21st-century African-American women singers
21st-century Filipino women singers
Filipino emigrants to the United States
Filipino people of African-American descent
People from San Pedro, Laguna
Asian American music